Free Fall Into Fear is the fourth album by Norwegian black/gothic metal band Trail of Tears.

Track listing
"Joyless Trance of Winter" – 4:20
"Carrier of the Scars of Life" – 5:31
"Frail Expectations" – 5:26
"Cold Hand of Retribution" – 4:41
"Watch You Fall" – 4:57
"The Architect of My Downfall" – 3:41
"Drink Away the Demons" – 4:17
"Point Zero" – 3:33
"Dry Well of Life" – 3:39
"The Face of Jealousy" – 4:56

Personnel
Ronny Thorsen - vocals
Kjetil Nordhus - vocals
Runar Hansen - lead guitars
Terje Heiseldal - guitars
Kjell Rune Hagen - bass guitar
Frank Roald Hagen - keyboards
 Jonathan Pérez - drums

References

Trail of Tears (band) albums
2005 albums
Napalm Records albums